The Anglo-French was an English automobile manufactured by Leon l'Hollier's Anglo-French Motor Carriage Company of Birmingham from 1896 to 1897; the cars were basically Roger-Benz vehicles modified for the British market.

See also
 List of car manufacturers of the United Kingdom

1890s cars
Veteran vehicles
Defunct motor vehicle manufacturers of England
Defunct companies based in Birmingham, West Midlands

Cars introduced in 1896